Har Mushkil Ka Hal Akbar Birbal is an Indian historical comedy television series which aired on BIG Magic. It stars Kiku Sharda and Vishal Kotian. A bhojpuri language dubbed version aired on Big Ganga.

Plot
The show's story is based on the well known folklore characters, Akbar and Birbal have been extremely popular with the kids for their combined wit and wisdom. The show is a fresh, comic take on the relation between Emperor Akbar and his seventh jewel Birbal that not only makes one laugh but also teaches valuable lessons. The first in the genre of Historical Comedy, Akbar Birbal has captured the audience's imagination with its delightful storyline and stellar cast.

Cast

Main
 Kiku Sharda as King Akbar
 Vishal Kotian as Birbal
 Kishwer Merchant as Urvashi
 Delnaaz Irani as Queen Jodha Bai (2014-2016)
 Pragati Mehra as Rani Sahiba / Jodha Bai (2016)
 Thakur Anoop Singh as Sharafat Khan (S1, Episodes 134-135) / Mullah Do Piyaza
 Sunil Chauhan as Wazeer-e-Azam Rana Baldev
 Pawan Singh as Prince Salim
 Sumit Arora as Vasudev
 Farzill Pardiawalla / Abhishek Oberoi as Tansen
 Rimpi Das as Anarkali  
 Yashkant Sharma as Raja Darban aka. Rajjah

Recurring
 Kunika Lal as Rani Durgavati
 Shehzad Khan (S2, Episodes 72-73) / Mohit Abrol / Gaurav Sharma as Turram Khan
 Sara Khan as Shaila Bano
 Rohit Khurana as Viraat
 Ram Awana as Hakim / Raja Aloknath and Moonga

Guest
 Chetan Hansraj as Rehmat Khan (S1, Episode 136)
 Shalini Sahuta as Sukanya (S1, Episode 142)
 Pankaj Dheer as King Abraham Quli Qutub Shah Wali (S1, Episode 148)
 Sudha Chandran as Bhavani / Teej Mata (S1, Episodes 68-69)
 Smita Bansal as Umrao Jaan (S1, Episodes 149-151)
 Roshni Chopra as Koyal (S1, Episodes 119-120)
 Lavina Tandon as Haseena (S3, Episodes 107-108)
 Aishwarya Sakhuja as Jiya (S2, Episode 08)
 Chaitanya Choudhry as Zeb Khan (S2, Episodes 25-26)
 Sargun Mehta as Yakshini (S3, Episodes 09-10)
 Mohena Singh as Rajkumari Roopali (S3, Episode 117)
 Adhvik Mahajan as Pishach Sohan (S1, Episodes 152-153) / Chandan (S2, Episode 32)
 Ankit Gera as Raja Ranjit Singh (S3, Episode 112)
 Roop Durgapal as Icchadhari Nagin (S2, Episodes 53-54)
 Madhura Naik as Qayamat Bano (S1, Episode 178)
 Raquib Arshad as Cheddhi
 Bhupindder Bhoopii as Changez Khan 
 Umesh Bajpai as Kaali (S1, Episode 121)
 Ehsaan Qureshi as Shayar Amir Khan (S1, Episode 184)
 Samiksha Bhatt as Shantipriya (S1, Episode 31-32)
 Ruma Sharma as Saloni (S4, Episode 24)
 Adi Irani as Bairam Khan (S3, Episode 18-19)
 Rajveer Singh Rajput as Thief
 Poorti Arya as Deewani-Mastani
 Sapan Gulati as Prince Veer
 Amrita Prakash as Princess Aishwarya (S2, Episode 78)
 Ketan Karande as Rajkumar Surajbhan (S2, Episode 23-24)
 Rajesh Khera as Raja Ali Raza (S2, Episode 20-21) / Mirza Muhammad Hakim (S2, Episode 104-107)
 Krish Parekh as Kabir

Awards

Indian Telly Awards

|-
| 2016 || Kiku Sharda || Best Actor in a Supporting Role (Comedy) || 
|}

References

External links

Har Mushkil Ka Hal Akbar Birbal Streaming on Netflix
 Har Muskil ka Hal Akbar Birbal Available on Zee5

Big Magic original programming
2014 Indian television series debuts
Mughal Empire in fiction
2016 Indian television series endings
Indian comedy television series
Cultural depictions of Akbar
Cultural depictions of Tansen